Aculus is a genus of mites, including the following species:

Species

Aculus ablopurpurascus Huang, 2001
Aculus acanthae (Mohanasundaram, 1982)
Aculus acraspis (Nalepa, 1892)
Aculus acutangulae Mohanasundaram, 1985
Aculus advens (Keifer, 1938)
Aculus aegerinus (Nalepa, 1892)
Aculus aesculi Domes, 2003
Aculus aflatunivagrans (Ponomareva, 1978)
Aculus africanae (Meyer & Ueckermann, 1990)
Aculus albopurpurascus Huang, 2001
Aculus alfalfae (Roivainen, 1950)
Aculus altus (Nalepa, 1909)
Aculus amandae (Keifer, 1969)
Aculus ambrosiae (Keifer, 1943)
Aculus amygdalina (Banks, 1912)
Aculus anthobius (Nalepa, 1892)
Aculus aphanotrichus (Liro, 1943)
Aculus aphelus Smith-Meyer & Ueckermann, 1990
Aculus arbosti (Cotte, 1924)
Aculus arceosae (Briones & McDaniel, 1976)
Aculus argenteae (Farkas, 1963)
Aculus arzakanensis (Bagdasarian, 1970)
Aculus asclepiellus Keifer, 1965
Aculus asperi (Chandrapatya & Boczek, 2002)
Aculus asperus Channabasavanna, 1966
Aculus asteri (Petanovic & Boczek, 2000)
Aculus atlantazaleae (Keifer, 1940)
Aculus atturensis Mohanasundaram, 1980
Aculus aucupariae (Liro, 1943)
Aculus baccaureae (Farkas, 1960)
Aculus bacsetae Flechtmann & Davis, 1971
Aculus balevskii Natcheff, 1966
Aculus ballei (Nalepa, 1891)
Aculus bambusae Kuang, 1991
Aculus bangalorensis Mohanasundaram, 1985
Aculus beeveri (Manson & Gerson, 1986)
Aculus betuli (Nalepa, 1897)
Aculus blagayanae Jocic, Petanovic & Vidovic, 2011
Aculus brevisetus Carmona, 1972
Aculus broussaisiae Keifer, 1964
Aculus broussenetiae Lin-Fuping, Jin-Changle & Kuang-Haiyua, 1997
Aculus bursifex (Nalepa, 1921)
Aculus calcarifer (Liro, 1943)
Aculus calystegiae (Lamb, 1952)
Aculus campbelli Knihinicki & Boczek, 2003
Aculus capellae Keifer, 1979
Aculus capsibaccati (Keifer, 1979)
Aculus carsonellus (Keifer, 1966)
Aculus caryfoliae Keifer, 1961
Aculus cassiae Mondal & Chakrabarti, 1981
Aculus catappae Boczek & Davis, 1984
Aculus cauliflorus Boczek & Davis, 1984
Aculus cayratiae Kuang-Haiyua, 1987
Aculus cercidii (Keifer, 1965)
Aculus cercidis (Hall, 1967)
Aculus chaitus Keifer, 1965
Aculus chamaespartii Carmona, 1974
Aculus charniae Smith-Meyer & Ueckermann, 1990
Aculus chihuahuae (Keifer, 1979)
Aculus clerodendri Smith-Meyer & Ueckermann, 1990
Aculus cneorum (Smith-Meyer & Ueckermann, 1990)
Aculus colei Channabasavanna, 1966
Aculus comatus (Nalepa, 1892)
Aculus conspicillatus Flechtmann in Flechtmann & Moraes, 2003
Aculus convolvuli (Nalepa, 1891)
Aculus coronillae (Canestrini & Massalongo, 1893)
Aculus corynocarpi (Manson, 1984)
Aculus cotyledonis (Keifer, 1939)
Aculus craspedobius (Nalepa, 1925)
Aculus crataegumplicans (Cotte, 1910)
Aculus cribatus (Keifer, 1961)
Aculus cysticola (Canestrini, 1892)
Aculus cytisi Labanowski in Soika & Labanowski, 2000
Aculus daibuensis Huang, 2001
Aculus daneki Shi & Boczek, 2000
Aculus daphnes (Roivainen, 1951)
Aculus didymbotryae Abou-Awad & El-Banhawy, 1992
Aculus dimidiatus (Hall, 1967)
Aculus dipterocarpi Boczek, 1993
Aculus dominguensis (Cromroy, 1958)
Aculus epilobiorum (Liro, 1940)
Aculus epiphyllus (Nalepa, 1892)
Aculus eurynotus (Nalepa, 1894)
Aculus excoecaria (Mondal & Chakrabarti, 1982)
Aculus fabus Boczek & Knihinicki, 1998
Aculus fascigrans Boczek & Shi in Boczek, Shi & Lewandowski, 2002
Aculus ficivagrans Mohanasundaram, 1985
Aculus flacourtiae Mohanasundaram, 1984
Aculus fockeui (Nalepa & Trouessart, 1891)
Aculus fraxini (Nalepa, 1894)
Aculus gemmarum (Nalepa, 1892)
Aculus glacialis (Thomas, 1885)
Aculus glechomae (Liro, 1940)
Aculus groenlandicus (Rostrup, 1900)
Aculus gutierrezi (Keifer, 1973)
Aculus haloragi (Lamb, 1953)
Aculus hapsis Smith-Meyer & Ueckermann, 1990
Aculus harpazi Smith-Meyer & Ueckermann, 1990
Aculus heatherae (Manson, 1984)
Aculus hedysari (Liro, 1941)
Aculus helianthemi (Roivainen, 1950)
Aculus helichrysi (Meyer & Ueckermann, 1990)
Aculus hippocastani (Fockeu, 1890)
Aculus huangzhongensis Kuang, 2000
Aculus hygrophilus (Roivainen, 1953)
Aculus hyperici (Liro, 1943)
Aculus ichnocarpi (Ghosh & Chakrabarati, 1989)
Aculus indicus Channabasavanna, 1966
Aculus inquilinus Berezantsev, 1989
Aculus jahandiezi (Cotte, 1924)
Aculus jilinensis (Kuang, 1995)
Aculus juglandis Natcheff, 1966
Aculus khayae Smith-Meyer & Ueckermann, 1990
Aculus kochi (Nalepa & Thomas, 1894)
Aculus kolengii Mohanasundaram, 1981
Aculus konoellus Keifer, 1965
Aculus kumari (Mohanasundaram, 1982)
Aculus lactucae (Canestrini, 1893)
Aculus laevigatae (Hassan, 1928)
Aculus laevis (Nalepa, 1892)
Aculus lambi (Manson, 1965)
Aculus latilobus (Keifer, 1955)
Aculus latus (Nalepa, 1894)
Aculus leguminae (Mohanasundaram, 1982)
Aculus leionotus (Nalepa, 1891)
Aculus leonotis Smith-Meyer & Ueckermann, 1990
Aculus lepidii (Roivainen, 1953)
Aculus leptadeniae Mohanasundaram, 1985
Aculus ligustri (Keifer, 1938)
Aculus liquidambaris (Keifer, 1940)
Aculus longanensis Wei & Kuang, 1997
Aculus longifilis (Canestrini, 1891)
Aculus longinychus (Smith-Meyer & Ueckermann, 1990)
Aculus longiseta Carmona, 1972
Aculus magnirostris (Nalepa, 1892)
Aculus malus (Zaher & Abou, Awad, 1979)
Aculus malvae Boczek & Davis, 1984
Aculus mansoni Amrine & Stasny, 1994
Aculus marinkovici Petanovic, 1987
Aculus martialis (Liro, 1941)
Aculus masseei (Nalepa, 1925)
Aculus mastigophorus (Nalepa, 1890)
Aculus maximilianae (Briones & McDaniel, 1976)
Aculus megacrinis Keifer, 1962
Aculus meghriensis (Bagdasarian, 1970)
Aculus meliae Kuang & Zhuo, 1989
Aculus melicoccae (Boczek & Oleczek, 1988)
Aculus menoni Channabasavanna, 1966
Aculus merostichus (Nalepa, 1918)
Aculus mespili (Bagdasarian, 1981)
Aculus micheneri (Hall, 1967)
Aculus microspinatus (Hall, 1967)
Aculus minor (Nalepa, 1892)
Aculus minutissimus (Hodgkiss, 1913)
Aculus minutus (Nalepa, 1890)
Aculus mogeri (Farkas, 1960)
Aculus montanae Mohanasundaram, 1985
Aculus moringae Channabasavanna, 1966
Aculus morivagrans Boczek, 1968
Aculus mumis (Kuang & Gong, 1996)
Aculus myrsinites (Roivainen, 1947)
Aculus nigrus Keifer, 1959
Aculus niphlocladae (Keifer, 1966)
Aculus ocimumae Mohanasundaram, 1991
Aculus olearius Castagnoli, 1977
Aculus oresterae (Keifer, 1978)
Aculus ornatus (Roivainen, 1947)
Aculus osteospermi Smith-Meyer & Ueckermann, 1990
Aculus parafockeui Liu & Kuang, 1998
Aculus parakarensis (Bagdasarian, 1972)
Aculus parapycnanthemi Keifer, 1964
Aculus parvensis (Manson, 1972)
Aculus parvifoli (Smith-Meyer & Ueckermann, 1990)
Aculus parvus (Nalepa, 1892)
Aculus pavoniae Smith-Meyer & Ueckermann, 1990
Aculus phaneris Amrine, 2002
Aculus phyllocopteoides (Nalepa, 1891)
Aculus physodesi (Keifer, 1979)
Aculus pimpinellae (Liro, 1941)
Aculus pistaciae Kuang-Haiyuan, 1998
Aculus pitangae Boczek & Davis, 1984
Aculus pittosporae (Mohanasundaram, 1982)
Aculus pittosporacus Amrine & Stasny, 1994
Aculus pittosporae (Mohanasundaram, 1982)
Aculus podanthi (Nalepa, 1929)
Aculus pretoriensis (Meyer & Ueckermann, 1990)
Aculus pritchardi (Keifer, 1953)
Aculus prunelli (Liro, 1942)
Aculus pteleaevagrans Boczek, 1964
Aculus pterygospermae Mohanasundaram, 1985
Aculus pulaviensis Boczek, 1968
Aculus pycnorhynchus (Nalepa, 1925)
Aculus quinquilobus (Hodgkiss, 1913)
Aculus reticulatus (Nalepa, 1890)
Aculus retiolatus (Nalepa, 1892)
Aculus rhamnivagrans (Keifer, 1939)
Aculus rhododendronis (Keifer, 1940)
Aculus rhopodacrus Smith-Meyer & Ueckermann, 1990
Aculus ribis (Massee, 1929)
Aculus rigidus (Nalepa, 1894)
Aculus rubiae (Roivainen, 1953)
Aculus rugosus (Sapozhnikova, 1980)
Aculus salicis Kuang & Luo, 1997
Aculus salicisalbae (Nalepa, 1925)
Aculus salicisarbusculae (Nalepa, 1925)
Aculus salicisforbyanae (Nalepa, 1925)
Aculus salicisfragilis (Nalepa, 1925)
Aculus salicisgrandifoliae (Nalepa, 1925)
Aculus salicisincanae (Nalepa, 1925)
Aculus salicisretusae (Nalepa, 1925)
Aculus sarcococcae Mohanasundaram, 1985
Aculus sargentodoxae Wei & Kuang, 1997
Aculus sarothamni Boczek, 1961
Aculus sayanicus Skoracka in Skoracka & Pacyna, 2003
Aculus schlechtendali (Nalepa, 1890)
Aculus schmardae (Nalepa, 1889)
Aculus schubarti (Farkas, 1960)
Aculus scutellariae (Canestrini & Massalongo, 1895)
Aculus semenovi (Shevtchenko, Marikovski & Shamsutdinova, 1973)
Aculus shanghaiensis Kuang, 1997
Aculus shaoxingensis Kuang-Haiyuan, 1998
Aculus shoreum (Ghosh, Mondal & Chakrabarti, 1986)
Aculus smilacis Keifer, 1962
Aculus solani Boczek & Davis, 1984
Aculus stachysi (Petanovic & Boczek, 1991)
Aculus staphyleae (Pantanelli, 1912)
Aculus stigmatus (Nalepa, 1914)
Aculus succiphagus (Meyer & Ueckermann, 1990)
Aculus symphoricarpi (Keifer, 1939)
Aculus syriacus (Fockeu, 1892)
Aculus tamalpais (Keifer, 1939)
Aculus tetanothrix (Nalepa, 1889)
Aculus tetracanthus Smith-Meyer & Ueckermann, 1990
Aculus tetraspermae (Chandrapatya, 1992)
Aculus teucrii (Nalepa, 1892)
Aculus thomasi (Nalepa, 1895)
Aculus tibialis (Liro, 1943)
Aculus tiliaevagrans Boczek, 1964
Aculus tomentosi (Meyer & Ueckermann, 1990)
Aculus triflorae (Di Stefano, 1966)
Aculus trifolii Natcheff, 1979
Aculus truncatus (Nalepa, 1892)
Aculus ulae Boczek, 1961
Aculus unctus Boczek, 1964
Aculus undatae Smith-Meyer & Ueckermann, 1990
Aculus vallis Keifer, 1966
Aculus variabilis (Roivainen, 1953)
Aculus verbenae (Keifer, 1977)
Aculus vermicularis (Nalepa, 1914)
Aculus verrucosus Flechtmann, 1996
Aculus viburni Petanovic, Boczek & Shi, 2002
Aculus viburnifoliae (Boczek & Shi, 1995)
Aculus vitecicola (Kikuti, 1939)
Aculus wagnoni (Keifer, 1959)
Aculus wisterifoliae Keifer, 1963
Aculus xylostei (Canestrini, 1891)
Aculus yelagiriensis Mohanasundaram, 1980
Aculus zaheri (Abou-Awad, 1979)
Aculus zygophylli Smith-Meyer & Ueckermann, 1990

References

External links

Eriophyidae
Taxa named by Hartford H Keifer
Trombidiformes genera